Jozsef Bokor from the Hungarian Academy of Science, Budapest, Hungary was named Fellow of the Institute of Electrical and Electronics Engineers (IEEE) in 2012 for contributions to system identification and multivariable control system design.

References

Fellow Members of the IEEE
Living people
Year of birth missing (living people)
Place of birth missing (living people)